Sumitra Mukherjee (30 March 1949 – 21 May 2003) was an Indian Bengali actress who was recognized for her work in Bengali cinema. Her on-screen pairings with actors such as Ranjit Mallick, Uttam Kumar, Soumitra Chatterjee, Santu Mukhopadhyay and Dipankar Dey were popular.

Early life 
Born on 30 March 1949, Sumitra Mukherjee was also known as Hashi (Smile).

Career

She got her break in the film " Ajker Nayak " directed by Dinen Gupta in 1972 With Kali Bannerjee, Samit Bhanja, Kalyan Chatterjee, Shekhar Chatterjee. She portrayed a number of memorable roles during her 32 years of acting career and was lauded for her natural acting abilities.

Personal life
Sumitra Mukherjee was married and is survived by two sons from that marriage.

Death
She died at the age of 54 on 21 May 2003.

Awards and nominations
 Won, Bengal Film Journalists' Association – Best Supporting Actress Award  for Devi Choudhurani  (1975)
 Won, Bengal Film Journalists' Association – Best Supporting Actress Award for Anweshan  (1986)
 Won. Filmfare Awards East - Best Actress for Baisakhi Megh

Filmography

References

External links

Bengali people
1949 births
2003 deaths
Actresses in Bengali cinema
20th-century Indian actresses